Vladimir Alexandrovich Gomelsky (born 20 October 1953 in Leningrad) is a Russian TV commentator, journalist, and writer. He is also a former Soviet professional basketball player and coach.

Basketball career
Gomelsky spent his entire basketball playing career with CSKA. In 1975, he received the title of Master of Sports of the USSR International Class. With CSKA, he was a four-time champion of the USSR Premier League, and also won the USSR Cup.

After he ended his playing career, he worked as a basketball coach. He was named an Honored Coach of the Russian SSR in 1986.

Personal life
Gomelsky is the son of the late prominent basketball coach Alexander Gomelsky, and the nephew of Evgeny Gomelsky. Since 1989, he has worked as a sports commentator.

His favourite team is the Philadelphia 76ers and player Julius Erving.

References

External links

 Биография 

1953 births
Living people
Honoured Coaches of Russia
PBC CSKA Moscow players
Jewish men's basketball players
Russian basketball coaches
Russian male journalists
Russian Jews
Russian men's basketball players
Russian sports journalists
Russian television presenters
Soviet basketball coaches
Sports commentators
Soviet men's basketball players